Baran is a town in Vitebsk Region, eastern Belarus. It is located in the southeast of the region. Administratively, Baran is subordinate to the city of Orsha. As of 2009, its population was 11,662.

History
Baran was first mentioned in 1470 and chartered in 1598 by Krzysztof Radziwiłł. At the time, the area belonged to Poland. In 1772, during the First Partition of Poland, Baran was transferred to Russia and became a selo, a center of Baranskaya Volost of Orshansky Province of Mogilev Governorate. In 1777, the provinces were abolished, and Baran became a selo in Orshansky Uyezd. In 1919, Mogilev Governorate was abolished, and Baran was transferred to Gomel Governorate. In 1920, Orshansky Uyezd with Baran was transferred to Vitebsk Governorate, and in 1924, the governorate was abolished.

From 1924, Baran was a part of Orsha Raion, which belonged to Vitebsk Okrug of Byelorussian Soviet Socialist Republic. In 1935, Baran became an urban-type settlement. On January 15, 1938 Vitebsk Region was established, and Orsha Raion with Baran was transferred to the oblast.

During the World War II Baran was occupied by the German troops, the Jewish population was executed. A witness to a mass shooting of the Jews of Baran stated, "The perpetrators were put together in a special unit of 6 persons. They had a black uniform and machine guns. The policemen threw the Jews in front of the grave, they were then shot by families."

In 1960, Orsha was made a city of oblast significance, and Baran was transferred from Orshansky District and became subordinate to the city of Orsha. In 1972, Baran obtained a town status.

Economy

Industry
In 1873 Mehzhinsky, an estate owner, founded in Baran a mechanical plant, which was producing nails. During the World War II, the plant was evacuated to the east, and after the war it was restored and started production of radio stations.

Transportation
Baran is located on a highway connecting Orsha with Shkloŭ and further with Mogilev. The closest railway station, also on the railway connecting Orsha and Mogilev, is Khorobrovo, just outside the town.

Culture and recreation
Almost no traces of the old town survived. The only two notable pre-1917 buildings are a poorhouse and a mechanical workshop.

References

Towns in Belarus
Populated places in Vitebsk Region
Orsha District
Vitebsk Voivodeship
Orshansky Uyezd
Holocaust locations in Belarus
Populated places on the Dnieper in Belarus